A constable is a person holding a particular office, most commonly in criminal law enforcement. The office of constable can vary significantly in different jurisdictions. A constable is commonly the rank of an officer within the police. Other people may be granted powers of a constable without holding this title.

Etymology

Historically, the title comes from the Latin comes stabuli (attendant to the stables, literally count of the stable) and originated from the Roman Empire; originally, the constable was the officer responsible for keeping the horses of a lord or monarch.

The title was imported to the monarchies of medieval Europe, and in many countries developed into a high military rank and great officer of State (e.g. the Constable of France, in French Connétable de France, who was the commander-in-chief of all royal armed forces (second to the king) until prime minister Cardinal Richelieu abolished the charge in 1627).

Most constables in modern jurisdictions are law enforcement officers. In the United Kingdom, the Commonwealth of Nations and some Continental European countries, a constable is the lowest rank of police officer (it is also, when preceded by the term sworn, used to describe any police officer with arrest and other powers), while in the United States a constable is generally an elected peace officer with lesser jurisdiction than a sheriff; however, in the Channel Islands a constable is an elected office-holder at the parish level.

Historically, a constable could also refer to a castellan, the officer charged with the defence of a castle. Even today, there is a Constable of the Tower of London.

An equivalent position is that of marshal, which derives from Old High German marah (horse) and schalh (servant), and originally meant "stable keeper", which has a similar etymology.

Usage by country and region

Australia

In Australia, as in the United Kingdom, constable is the lowest rank in most police services. It is often categorised into the following (from lowest to highest): probationary constable; constable; constable first class; senior constable; leading senior constable. These variations depend on the individual state/territory police force in question.

Senior constable generally refers to a police officer of the rank above constable, and is denoted by way of two chevrons/stripes.

The New South Wales Police Force has three grades of senior constable, namely senior constable (two chevrons), incremental senior constable (two chevrons and a horizontal bar), and leading senior constable (two chevrons and two horizontal bars). A senior constable is senior to a constable but junior to an incremental senior constable. Promotion to senior constable can occur after a minimum of five years' service (one year as a probationary constable in addition to four years as constable) and then upon passing probity checks and an exam. Incremental senior constable is attained after ten years of service automatically. One is appointed to the rank of leading senior constable on a qualification basis, but must have a minimum of seven years' service amongst other criteria in order to be eligible. Leading senior constable is a specialist position of which there are limited allocated numbers within any section/unit or local area command. If an officer is transferred to another duty type or station, the officer is then relieved of the position of leading senior constable: it is primarily a position for field training officers who oversee the training and development of inexperienced probationary constables or constables.

Within Victoria Police, a senior constable is the rank above a constable, while above a senior constable is a leading senior constable. When first introduced into Victoria Police, the leading senior constable was a classification not a rank, somewhat like "detective"; leading senior constables were appointed specifically to assist in the training and mentoring of more junior members. The last round of wage negotiations, however, saw leading senior constable become a rank in its own right, one that a lot of members will pass through on their way from constable to sergeant, though this is not strictly necessary and it is permissible to be promoted to sergeant direct from senior constable. The general form of address for both senior constable and leading senior constable is "senior", and this is acceptable even in courts.

Canada

In Canada, as in the United Kingdom, constable is the lowest rank in most law enforcement services, including the Royal Canadian Mounted Police. In Newfoundland the provincial police are the Royal Newfoundland Constabulary, whereby all officers are addressed by the term "constable".

In addition, the chief officers of some municipal police services in Canada, notably Vancouver Police Department, carry the title of chief constable.

In Canadian French, constable is translated to agent, except in the Royal Canadian Mounted Police where it is translated as gendarme.

Appointments can further be separated into:
 Special constables
 RCMP special constables are appointed for specific skills, for example aboriginal language skills. They are peace officers under the Royal Canadian Mounted Police Act.
 Outside of the RCMP, special constables are not police officers but are appointed to serve certain law enforcement functions, for example SPCA agents or court/jail officers.
 Auxiliary constables, or reserve constables, are volunteers with a policing agency. They generally have peace officer status only when engaged in specific authorized tasks.
 Provincial civil constables (in Nova Scotia) deal with matters of a civil nature.

Denmark

Within the Danish Defence, constables are the lowest rank group. However,  is only used within the army, as both the navy and air force use a specialist rank instead.

Finland
In the Finnish Police, the lowest rank of police officer is called nuorempi konstaapeli, translated into English as (junior) constable.

The next rank is vanhempi konstaapeli or senior constable.

The next highest rank (equivalent to a police sergeant in the English-speaking world) is ylikonstaapeli (yli- "leading"), literally "over-constable".

Hong Kong
The Hong Kong Police Force have two ranks for constables:

 Senior constable—lead officer in a beat patrol; SPCs wear a single chevron on their shoulder above their unique identification (UI) number.
 Constable—officer in a beat patrol; PCs wear no insignia other than the unique identification (UI) number.

Senior constable is not a rank: it is merely a designation for officers who have served for 18 years.

India

Police constable (abbreviated PC) is the lowest police rank in India, followed by head constable. General law and order being a state subject in India, each state government recruits police constables. A police constable has no shoulder insignia, while a head constable has one or more stripes or chevrons, depending on the state. In Kerala Police, a Civil Police Officer (abbreviated CPO) rank exists, similar to the Police Constable rank: Kerala State Government has changed the nomenclature of Police Constable rank to Civil Police Officer; similarly, Head Constable rank is known as Senior Civil Police Officer. Since each state has its own police force, the uniforms and insignia of the police vary, though the rank structure is the same. The Central Armed Police Forces (CAPF), under the Ministry of Home Affairs of Government of India, also maintain the same ranks as state police even though their jurisdiction varies considerably, the constables recruited to CAPF having to do duty all over India. Nearly all the police constables wear khaki-coloured uniforms which indicate that they are police personnel.

Generally there are three types of constables in India, depending upon the unit/wing/branch/section they are attached to. Civil police constables are attached to a police station, traffic police constables for control of road traffic, whereas armed police constables are attached to armed police units. The types of constables are based on nature of duties. The Indian police constables do a wide range of duties like patrol, beat system, crime detection, escort of prisoners and VIPs, guarding vital offices and installations, vehicle traffic control on roads, riot control, assisting civil administration during disasters, epidemics and elections as well as other tasks. Generally a police constable does his duty in his jurisdiction area, but can be assigned anywhere by his superiors depending on the situation or need. The duty hours of Indian police constables are erratic, many times without weekly off or leave.

Police recruitment is based on a written test, plus physical and medical tests. After appointment all police constables have to undergo compulsory training; the duration of training may vary from nine months to one year depending on state. The training and duty of police is physically and mentally strenuous in India.

All senior officers are Indian Police Service officers appointed through civil services exam.

Norway
In the Norwegian Police Service the rank  was until 2003 the lowest rank in the police, the next ranks being "politioverkonstabel", "politibetjent", "politiførstebetjent", "politioverbetjent" and "politistasjonssjef", "lensmann" or "sysselmannsoverbetjent" (all officially translated as chief superintendent). In 2003, the ranks "politikonstabel", "politioverkonstabel" and "politibetjent" were renamed "politibetjent 1", "politibetjent 2" and "politibetjent 3", where "politibetjent 1" is the entry-level rank for a policeman and most junior rank of the police service. All ranks higher than chief superintendent are commissioned ranks, known simply as "higher ranks", and traditionally required a law degree.

The Norwegian Police Service has an integrated prosecution service in which the police lawyers, who all hold higher ranks, require the law degree "candidatus/candidata juris" or "Master of Laws" (master i rettsvitenskap), awarded after five or six years of law studies. Following reforms of the police, a law degree is no longer required by law for all higher ranks, although only lawyers can act as prosecutors and supervise criminal investigations, for which reason it is still common for those holding higher ranks to be lawyers. The entry-level rank for a lawyer, junior police prosecutor, outranks the most senior rank for a policeman, chief superintendent, as the former is the most junior of the "higher ranks" whereas the latter is the most senior of the "lower ranks".

The fire brigades (all municipal) still use "konstabel" as in "brannkonstabel" (fire-constable).

In 2016 the Royal Norwegian Navy started using "konstabel" to describe the enlisted ranks in the navy. Other ranks (OR) 2 to 4+ all use the term "konstabel":

 OR 2 Visekonstabel
 OR 3 Ledende Visekonstabel
 OR 4 Konstabel
 OR 4+ Ledende Konstabel

Pakistan
In Pakistan, constable and head constable are, respectively, the lowest and second-lowest ranks in the police force. The police constables in Pakistan do a wide range of duties like patrol, crime detection, escort of prisoners and VIPs, vehicle traffic control on roads, riot control, assisting civil administration during disasters, epidemic, elections and other tasks.

Singapore
In Singapore, a police constable (abbreviated to PC) is the lowest rank in the Singapore Police Force.

The rank of special constable exists, but is centralised under the Volunteer Special Constabulary in Singapore.

Sri Lanka
In Sri Lanka, the Sri Lanka Police have the rank of "police constable", with four classes.

United Kingdom

In modern times, there are two main definitions of a constable in the United Kingdom:
The lowest rank of a police force.
A legal term for an officer with the powers of a police officer.
The latter usage is mainly in formal contexts, including legislation such as the Police and Criminal Evidence Act 1984. By this definition all police officers are constables, even those that do not hold the actual rank of constable. Thus the head of most police forces is a chief constable, volunteer officers of any rank are known as special constables, and some police forces have the word "Constabulary" in their name.

Within the police itself, there are three eponymous offices bearing the legal power of constable: police constable, detective constable and special constable. The former two of these are paid, mostly full-time positions, while those holding the role of special constable volunteer their time unpaid and do so around their normal working commitments. The ranks of police constable and detective constable are often abbreviated in everyday use to PC and DC respectively. From 1919, when they were first recruited in the UK, female police officers were distinguished from their male counterparts by the prefix 'woman' before their rank (WPC or WDC). This was officially discontinued in 1999, although it is still sometimes used informally by members of the public.

Constable
Constable is the first rank, one rank below a sergeant and five ranks below chief superintendent in all police forces in the United Kingdom.

Within the British Police, all police officers are sworn in as and hold the basic powers of a constable. Upon being sworn in, each officer starts at the rank of constable and is required to undergo a two-year probationary period. Upon successful completion, constables can remain at their current rank, specialise in criminal investigations or one of many other specialist units, or apply for promotion to sergeant, the first supervisory rank. Constables wear an epaulette attached to the uniform, displaying their collar number (also called a shoulder number). Within Greater London's Metropolitan Police, all constables and sergeants display a divisional identifier, as well as an individual number.

A new probationary constable within a county police force is paid an annual salary of either £21,402 or £24,780 (dependent on entry route), with this rising to £27,030 after training, reaching a ceiling level of £41,130. Constables within the Metropolitan Police Service and City of London Police are paid an additional London weighting allowance which is currently set at £2,277.

The first female constables were employed by railway constabularies during World War I with, for example, the North East Railway Police swearing in four during late 1917. The term woman police constable (WPC) was used across British forces.

Detective constable
The rank of detective constable (DC) is a special type but not senior to that of a uniformed constable; the 'detective' prefix identifies the officer as having undertaken and passed the National Investigators' Examination.

Special  Constable
From 1673 to 1831, a special constable was a citizen who was appointed to act as constable on special occasions, such as to quell a riot. In 1831 this evolved to a permanent volunteer police force. Special constables generally had powers within a designated area. However, legislation changed to give them identical powers as constables that are no longer regional but are enforceable across England and Wales.

War Reserve Constable
During World War II, there was an additional volunteer War Reserve Police introduced in 1939, consisting at its height in 1944 of 17,000 War Reserve constables (or WRC, War Reserve Police Constable, WRPC). The rank of WRC/WRPC was dissolved on 31 December 1948, and most of these were then recruited for service as regular or special constables.

Head constable
Head constable is a title for a police sergeant in some Commonwealth police forces. It was also previously a senior rank in the Royal Irish Constabulary, with authority lying somewhere between the ranks of inspector and superintendent in later British and Irish police forces.

Legislation
Legislation existed to appoint constables, but often did not direct how such bodies should operate and what organisational form they should take. The Police Act 1964 standardised arrangements through establishing wider geographical police forces, which merged many constabularies. The Police Act 1964 gave direction on the organisational form of police forces, the appointment of officers and disciplinary matters; in the broadest sense it provided a statutory governance framework. The Act established the 'tripartite' model of policing, which formed police authorities. This established a three-way balance of power between the Authority's Chairman, the Chief Constable and the Home Secretary. This arrangement varied within London for the Metropolitan Police and the City of London Police.

The Police Act 1964 was superseded by the Police Act 1996, which contained similar provisions. Further legislation was introduced for the British Transport Police and the Civil Nuclear Constabulary that was similar in defining their organisational form and embedding governance arrangements.

Constables outside police forces
Legislation exists allowing specific roles to enjoy the full powers and privileges of a constable while carrying out their duty, even though these employees do not hold the office of Constable.
Environment Agency Water bailiffs, who check fishing permits and enforce some wildlife laws.
Her Majesty's Prison Service prison officers (only those employed by the state, not private employees contracted to operate in prisons). Prison officers enjoy the powers and privileges of a Constable only while acting in relation to their duty.
National Crime Agency (formerly SOCA) Investigators can be designated with the powers of a constable (as well as those of an Immigration Officer and Customs Officer). 
Ports, tunnels, Oxford and Cambridge Universities, Epping Forest, Anglican cathedrals (Cathedral constables), and markets can also appoint constables to police on their land. These are often referred to as 'private police forces/constabularies'.

Local authorities can appoint constables to enforce local by-laws, as seen in a number of London boroughs.

Within Scotland, a grazings constable has powers to manage a crofting common grazings and can be appointed by the Crofting Commission where the crofters fail to appoint a grazings committee.  A grazings constable has the same powers as a grazings committee.  A grazings constable may receive an annual remuneration which is paid for by the crofters sharing in the common grazings.

Channel Islands

In Jersey and Guernsey, the elected heads of the Parishes (paroisse(s) in French) are titled "constables" (connétable(s) in French). The constables are entitled each to carry a silver-tipped baton of office.

In Jersey, each parish elects a constable for a three-year mandate to run the parish and also represent the parish in the legislature, the States of Jersey. The constable presides over the Roads Committee, the Conseil Paroissial (Parish Council, the only exception being St. Helier) and Parish Assemblies. The twelve constables also collectively sit as the Comité des Connétables (Committee of Constables). The constable is the titular head of the Honorary Police. With the Roads Inspectors, Roads Committee and other officers, the constable of each parish also carries out the visites du branchage twice a year.

In Guernsey, each parish elects two constables, the senior constable and the junior constable. Persons elected generally serve a year as junior and then senior constable. The senior constable presides over the Douzaine (Dozen) that runs the parish. The constables are responsible for enforcing the brancage (summer hedge-cutting) and also have the power to declare any parishioner insane.

United States

In the United States, use of the term constable is inconsistent, and use may even vary within a state. A constable may be an official responsible for service of process, such as summonses and subpoenas for people to appear in court in criminal and/or civil matters; on the other hand, they can be fully empowered law enforcement officers. Constables may also have additional specialized duties unique to the office. In some states, a constable may be appointed by the governor or a judge or magistrate of the court which he or she serves; in others the constable is an elected or appointed position at the state or local level of local government. Their jurisdiction can vary from statewide to county/parish and local township boundaries based on the state's laws.

The office developed from its British counterpart during the colonial period. Prior to the modernization of law enforcement which took place in the mid-19th century, local law enforcement was performed by constables and watchmen. Constables were appointed or elected at the local level for specific terms and, like their UK counterparts the parish constable, were not paid and did not wear a uniform. However, they were often paid a fee by the courts for each writ served and warrant executed. Following the example of the British Metropolitan Police established in 1829, the states gradually enacted laws to permit municipalities to establish police departments. This differed from the UK in that the old system was not uniformly abolished in every state. Often the enacting legislation of the state conferred a police officer with the powers of a constable, the most important of these powers being the common law power of arrest. Police and constables exist concurrently in many jurisdictions. Perhaps because of this, the title "constable" is not used for police of any rank. The lowest rank in a police organization would be officer, deputy, patrolman, trooper and, historically, private, depending on the particular organization.

In many states, constables do not conduct patrols or preventive policing activities. In such states the office is relatively obscure to its citizens.

A constable may be assisted by deputy constables as sworn officers or constable's officers as civil staff, usually as process servers. In some states, villages or towns, an office with similar duties is marshal.

Historical usage

Medieval Armenia and Georgia
The titles of sparapet and spaspet, derived from the ancient Iranian spahbod, were used to designate the supreme commander of the armed forces in the medieval kingdoms of Armenia and Georgia, respectively.

Byzantine Empire
The position of constable originated from the Roman Empire; by the 5th century AD the Count of the Stable was responsible for the keeping of horses at the imperial court. The West European term "constable" itself was adopted, via the Normans, as konostaulos in the Komnenian and Palaiologan periods, when it became a high military office of dignity.

Late Roman administrative titles were used by Charlemagne in developing his empire; the position of Constable, along with the similar office of Marshal, spread throughout the emerging states of Western Europe during this period. In most medieval nations, the constable was the highest-ranking officer of the army, and was responsible for the overseeing of martial law.

China
Village-level Chinese officialsknown as tingzhang during the Qin and Han dynasties, lizheng, during the Sui and Tang, baozheng during the Song, and dibao and shoubao during the Qingare sometimes translated constable for their functions of reporting crimes and administering local justice, although they also served as tax agents and notaries.

France

The Constable of France (Connétable de France), under the French monarchy, was the First Officer of the Crown of France and was originally responsible for commanding the army. His symbol of office was a longsword held by a hand issuing out of a cloud, a reference to the constable's duty of carrying the king's sword during a coronation ceremony. Some constables were prominent military commanders in the medieval period, such as Bertrand du Guesclin who served from 1370 to 1380.

United Kingdom

The office of the constable was introduced in England following the Norman Conquest of 1066 and was responsible for the keeping and maintenance of the king's armaments and those of the villages as a measure of protecting individual settlements throughout the country. Some authorities place the origins of constables in England earlier, attributing the creation of the office to during the reign of King Alfred (871 A.D.).

The office of Lord High Constable, one of the Great Officers of State, was established in the kingdoms of England and Scotland during the reigns of King Stephen (1135–1154) and King David (1124–1154) respectively, and was responsible for the command of the army. However, the term was also used at the local level within the feudal system, describing an officer appointed to keep order. One of the first descriptions of one of the legal duties of a constable, that of the collation of evidence, comes from Bracton, a jurist writing between 1220 and 1250:
In whatever way they come and on whatever day, it is the duty of the constable to enroll everything in order, for he has record as to the things he sees; but he cannot judge, because there is no judgment at the Tower, since there the third element of a judicial proceeding is lacking, namely a judge and jurisdiction. He has record as to matters of fact, not matters of judgment and law. In Bracton's time, anyone seeing a "misdeed" was empowered to make an arrest. The role of the constable in Bracton's description was as the "eyes and ears" of the court, finding evidence and recording facts on which judges could make a ruling. By extension, the constable was also the "strong arm" of the court (i.e., of the common law), marking the basic role of the constable that continues into the present day.

In 1285, King Edward I of England passed the Statute of Winchester, with provisions which "constituted two constables in every hundred to prevent defaults in towns and [on] highways". Records of their narrower area successors, parish constables, appear in the early 17th century in the records of Buckinghamshire; traditionally they were elected by the parishioners, but from 1617 onwards were typically appointed by justices of the peace (magistrates) in each county.

The system of policing by unpaid parish constables continued in England until the 19th century; in the London metropolitan area it started to be ended with the creation of the Metropolitan Police by the Metropolitan Police Act 1829, and was completely ended by the Metropolitan Police Act 1839. Outside London, the mandatory introduction of county police forces by the County and Borough Police Act 1856, after nearly 20 years of the permissive County Police Act 1839, finally ended parish constables. After 1856, all areas of England and Wales were covered by a police force. The lowest rank of the police forces and constabularies is "constable", and most outside London are headed by a chief constable.

The unique office of 'Parks Constable' was first created when the Liverpool Corporation Act 1921 (Section 221) allowed for their appointment; prior to that a body of constables, whom were attested as special constables, had policed the parks. Specific legislation for the Royal Parks of London continued the unique office of 'Parks Constable'. However, the Royal Parks Constabulary was disbanded in 2001. The Kew Constabulary are sworn in under the same legislation and remain as the holders of the office of Parks Constable. Whilst some local authorities have parks constabularies, their officers are attested as constables, not parks constables.

Other European nations
The position of hereditary constable persists in some current or former monarchies of Europe. The position of Lord High Constable of Scotland is hereditary in the family of the Earl of Erroll. There is also a hereditary constable of Navarre in Spain; this position is currently held by the Duke of Alba.

Historically, many other hereditary constables existed as officers of state in former monarchies. Examples are the Constable of Castile (Condestable de Castilla) and the Constable of Portugal (Condestável do Reino).

See also
 Marshal
 Policing in the United Kingdom
 Policing in the United States
 Sheriff
 Individuals with powers of arrest
 Police
 Chief of police
 Highway patrol
 Constable of Chester

Notes

References

External links

Patrick Colquhoun, A Treatise on the Functions and Duties of a Constable. London: W. Bulmer and Co., 1803.
François Hotman, "Of the Constable and Peers of France," Franco-Gallia: Or, An Account of the Ancient Free State of France, and Most Other Parts of Europe, Before the Loss of Their Liberties.[1574], 2nd ed. 1721 English translation from the original Latin. Project Gutenberg e-text # 17894.
 
Provincial civil constables in Canada, CMPSNS.com

Law enforcement occupations
Law enforcement occupations in the United Kingdom
Law enforcement titles
Legal professions
Police ranks
Police ranks of Sri Lanka
Police ranks in the United Kingdom
Sheriffs
Constables